The 1970–71 Cincinnati Bearcats men's basketball team represented the University of Cincinnati during the 1970–71 NCAA men's basketball season.

Roster

Schedule

References 

Cincinnati Bearcats men's basketball seasons
Cincinnati
Cincinnati Bearcats Basketball
Cincinnati Bearcats Basketball